Two ships of the United States Navy have been named Brule after a county in south central South Dakota, established on 14 January 1875 and named for the Brule subdivision of the Sioux Indians.

 , was commissioned on 31 October 1944.
 , was commissioned on 31 October 1952.

References
 

United States Navy ship names